Comrades in Uniform (Swedish: Kamrater i vapenrocken) is a 1938 Swedish comedy film directed by Schamyl Bauman and starring Gösta Cederlund, Fritiof Billquist and Sigge Fürst. The film's sets were designed by the art director Arthur Spjuth.

Synopsis
Two friends are called up for their military service as a conscripts.

Cast
 Gösta Cederlund as 	Överste Skyller
 Fritiof Billquist as 	Löjtnant Skanse
 Sigge Fürst as 	Sergeant Swärd
 Elof Ahrle as 	Loffe Holm, beväring
 Sture Lagerwall as Pelle Sundin, beväring
 Tord Bernheim as 	Tage Fredman, beväring
 Henrik Dyfverman as 	Daniel Lundqvist, beväring
 Tollie Zellman as 	Laura Fredman
 Annalisa Ericson as Annika Gårdeman
 Nils Hultgren as Manfred
 Solveig Hedengran as 	Greta
 Anna Lindahl as Sonja
 Axel Högel as 	Teatervaktmästaren
 Åke Grönberg as 	Bonzo 
 Emil Fjellström as 	Supply Worker 
 Rolf Botvid as 	Hostile Soldier 
 Manne Grünberger as 	Hostile Soldier 
 Frithiof Bjärne as 	Soldier 
 Bellan Roos as 	Actress 
 Hugo Jacobsson as 	Captain 
 Nils Jacobsson as Captain 
 Nils Johannisson as Björn Forell 
 Ingrid Luterkort as Housemaid at Tuna 
 Ragnar Widestedt as 	Lieutenant

References

Bibliography 
 Qvist, Per Olov & von Bagh, Peter. Guide to the Cinema of Sweden and Finland. Greenwood Publishing Group, 2000.

External links 
 

1938 films
Swedish comedy films
1938 comedy films
1930s Swedish-language films
Films directed by Schamyl Bauman
1930s Swedish films